is the 10th major-label single by the Japanese girl idol group Shiritsu Ebisu Chugaku. It was released in Japan on September 21, 2016, on the label SME Records. This is the last single featuring Rina Matsuno, who died on February 8, 2017.

Release details 
The CD single was released in three editions: , Limited Edition B, and Limited Edition C. The differences between the editions are the cover art and the B-sides.

Reception 
According to Oricon, in its first week of release the physical CD single sold 14,446 copies. It debuted at number 7 in the Oricon weekly singles chart.

Track listing

Limited Edition A

Limited Edition B

Limited Edition C

Charts

References

External links 

 Discography on the Shiritsu Ebisu Chugaku official site

2016 singles
Japanese-language songs
Shiritsu Ebisu Chugaku songs
SME Records singles
2016 songs
Song articles with missing songwriters
Songs written by Katsuhiko Sugiyama